The canton of Haute-Ariège is an administrative division of the Ariège department, southern France. It was created at the French canton reorganisation which came into effect in March 2015. Its seat is in Ax-les-Thermes.

It consists of the following communes:
 
Albiès
Appy
Artigues
Ascou
Aston
Aulos-Sinsat
Axiat
Ax-les-Thermes
Bestiac
Bouan
Les Cabannes
Carcanières
Caussou
Caychax
Château-Verdun
Garanou
L'Hospitalet-près-l'Andorre
Ignaux
Larcat
Larnat
Lassur
Lordat
Luzenac
Mérens-les-Vals
Mijanès
Montaillou
Orgeix
Orlu
Ornolac-Ussat-les-Bains
Pech
Perles-et-Castelet
Le Pla
Prades
Le Puch
Quérigut
Rouze
Savignac-les-Ormeaux
Senconac
Sorgeat
Tignac
Unac
Urs
Ussat
Vaychis
Vèbre
Verdun
Vernaux

References

Cantons of Ariège (department)